is a railway station in the town of Shiwa, Iwate Prefecture, Japan, operated by the East Japan Railway Company (JR East).

Lines
Furudate Station is served by the Tōhoku Main Line, and is located 521.5 rail kilometers from the terminus of the line at Tokyo Station.

Station layout
The station has two opposed elevated side platforms with the station building is located underneath. The station is adjacent to the elevated rails of the Tōhoku Shinkansen, which does not stop at this station. The station is staffed and has a Midori no Madoguchi ticket office.

Platforms

History
Furudate Station was opened on 1 March 1949. The station was absorbed into the JR East network upon the privatization of the Japanese National Railways (JNR) on 1 April 1987.

Passenger statistics
In fiscal 2018, the station was used by an average of 725 passengers daily (boarding passengers only).

Surrounding area

See also
 List of Railway Stations in Japan

References

External links

 JR East Station information 

Railway stations in Iwate Prefecture
Tōhoku Main Line
Railway stations in Japan opened in 1949
Shiwa, Iwate
Stations of East Japan Railway Company